Nine on a Ten Scale is the debut solo album by American rock musician Sammy Hagar, released in May 1976 by Capitol Records. It was his first release after his departure from Montrose in 1975. It was announced in Billboard Magazine that Hagar was signed to Capitol Records in January of 1976. Nine on a Ten Scale was slated for a February 9th release date. 

The album sold poorly and was not successful.

Song information
 "Keep On Rockin'", a Hagar original, was covered by Bette Midler on the classic soundtrack to The Rose, albeit with a different arrangement.
 The track written by Van Morrison, "Flamingos Fly", was not released by Morrison until a year later on his 1977 album A Period of Transition. He gave the song to Hagar after they met at The Record Plant during the recording of the album. Morrison recorded a demo for Hagar which producer John S. Carter, Jr. and Hagar intended to produce as a duet with Morrison, a move which Morrison later rejected. Hagar then re-recorded the song from scratch.
 "China", a track written by the former Fleetwood Mac member Bob Welch, was not released by Welch until after this release. Welch included his version on the 1979 album Three Hearts.
 Ron Nagle's "Please Come Back" was originally included in the film, The Last Detail.
 "Young Girl Blues" is a Donovan cover.
 A demo version of "Rock 'n' Roll Romeo" was released as "Thinking of You" on The Essential Red Collection in 2004.

Track listing

Personnel

 Sammy Hagar – lead vocals, guitar
 Bill Church – bass guitar
 Scott Quick – guitars
 John Blakely – guitars
 Alan Fitzgerald – keyboards
 Joe Crane – keyboards
 Stan – keyboards
 Wizard – keyboards
 Aynsley Dunbar – drums
 Jim Hodder – drums
 Jerry Shirley – drums
 Dallas Taylor – drums
 Venetta Fields – backing vocals
 Maxayn Lewis – backing vocals
 Sherlie Matthews – backing vocals
 Bob Welch – backing vocals
 Greg Adams – horns
 Emilio Castillo – horns
 Mic Gillette – horns
 Steve Kupka – horns
 Lenny Pickett – horns
Technical
 Rich E. – engineer
 Tom Flye – engineer
 John Henning – engineer
 Gary Kellgren – engineer
 Cris Morris – engineer
 Deke Richards – engineer
 Jimmy Robinson – engineer
 John Stronack – engineer
 Roy Kohara – original art direction
 David Alexander – photography

Versions
 Capitol (US): SN-16049
 Fame (UK): FA 3068
 Capitol (Germany): 1C 038-82 216 (released with the title "Collection")
 BGO (1993 UK reissue): BGOCD182
 One Way Records (1996 US reissue): BGOCD18272438 19095 22
 Repertoire (2000 German reissue): REP 4869

See also 
 Sammy Hagar discography

References

External links 
 Nine on a Ten Scale on Hagar's website

1976 debut albums
Capitol Records albums
Sammy Hagar albums